Dexter Sharper (born July 9, 1971) is an American politician who has served in the Georgia House of Representatives from the 177th district since 2013.

References

1971 births
Living people
People from Valdosta, Georgia
21st-century American politicians
Democratic Party members of the Georgia House of Representatives